The 12th Artistic Gymnastics World Championships were held in Basel, the second largest city of Switzerland, on July 14-16, 1950. 20,000 spectators watched the championships, held for the first time in Switzerland, and the Swiss team was very successful in front of the home crowd.

Medallists

Men's results

Team competition

Individual all-around

Floor exercise

Pommel horse

Rings

Vault

Parallel bars

Horizontal bar

Women's Results

Team competition

Individual all-around

Vault

Uneven bars or flying rings

Balance beam

Floor exercise

Medals

References

External links
 Romanian Gymnastics Federation: 1950 Results
 Sports123

World Artistic Gymnastics Championships
Gym
1950 in gymnastics
International gymnastics competitions hosted by Switzerland